Stone Soup is a European folk story in which hungry strangers convince the people of a town to each share a small amount of their food in order to make a meal that everyone enjoys, and exists as a moral regarding the value of sharing. In varying traditions, the stone has been replaced with other common inedible objects, and therefore the fable is also known as axe soup, button soup, nail soup, and wood soup.

Story

Some travelers come to a village, carrying nothing more than an empty cooking pot. Upon their arrival, the villagers are unwilling to share any of their food stores with the very hungry travelers. Then the travelers go to a stream and fill the pot with water, drop a large stone in it, and place it over a fire. One of the villagers becomes curious and asks what they are doing. The travelers answer that they are making "stone soup", which tastes wonderful and which they would be delighted to share with the villager, although it still needs a little bit of garnish, which they are missing, to improve the flavor.

The villager, who anticipates enjoying a share of the soup, does not mind parting with a few carrots, so these are added to the soup. Another villager walks by, inquiring about the pot, and the travelers again mention their stone soup which has not yet reached its full potential. More and more villagers walk by, each adding another ingredient, like potatoes, onions, cabbages, peas, celery, tomatoes, sweetcorn, meat (like chicken, pork and beef), milk, butter, salt and pepper. Finally, the stone (being inedible) is removed from the pot, and a delicious and nourishing pot of soup is enjoyed by travelers and villagers alike. Although the travelers have thus tricked the villagers into sharing their food with them, they have successfully transformed it into a tasty meal which they share with the donors.

Variations 
An Eastern European variation of the story (which is similar to the Northern European rendition) is called "axe soup", with an axe as the catalyst.
In the French, Hungarian and Russian versions of the tale, the travelers are soldiers returning home.
In the Hungarian version, a single starving soldier tries to obtain food from villagers. He comes upon an old woman and tricks her into giving him the ingredients needed for the soup; At the end of the tale, they share the soup, and he sells the rock to the woman.
In Russian tradition, a soldier prepares "axe kasha". The tale ends with the soldier taking the axe when leaving, claiming he will eat it on the road.
Johann Peter Hebel wrote a German version, "Der schlaue Pilgrim" ("The Cunning Pilgrim", 1811), in which a wily pilgrim, allegedly on his way to Jerusalem, tricks a hostess step-by-step into adding rich soup ingredients to his pebble stones, finally leaving the stones uneaten.
 In Northern European and Scandinavian countries, the story is most commonly known as "nail soup", and the main character is typically a tramp looking for food and lodgings, who convinces an old woman that he will make a tasty nail soup for the both of them if she would just add a few ingredients for the garnish.
 In the Portuguese tradition, the traveler is a monk, and the story takes place around Almeirim, Portugal. Nowadays  is considered a regional dish of Almeirim.

Cultural and historical references
In the Aarne–Thompson–Uther folktale classification system this tale and set of variants is type 1548.

Art, entertainment, and media

"Stone soup"-like collaborations
There are many examples of projects referencing the "Stone Soup" story's theme of making something significant by accumulating many small contributions. Examples include: 
Dungeon Crawl Stone Soup, a computer game which expanded on an abandoned project using contributions from many different coders
Stone Soup, a children's literary magazine published by the California-based Children's Art Foundation since 1973
Stone Soupercomputer, a computer composed of many small units
Stone Soup, an open-source software project aimed at providing researchers and practitioners with a framework for the development and testing of Bayesian target tracking and state estimation algorithms.

Adaptations

Film
The film Fandango (1985) contains a wedding sequence towards the end which builds on the Stone Soup theme. The protagonists need to hold a wedding ceremony, but they lack the necessary funds. Therefore, they set up a folding card table by the main street of a sleepy Texas town, dust it off, and invite passersby to come to the wedding. As they concoct stories of delinquent caterers and crashed champagne trucks, the friendly townspeople contribute their time and resources, the result being a magical wedding ceremony.

Literature

Gerald P. Murphy's stage adaptation of "Stone Soup" was published by Lazy Bee Scripts in 2008 and has had successful productions in US, UK and France. 

Gerald Griffin wrote "The Collegians" (1829) which includes a version of limestone soup in chapter 30.

William Butler Yeats' play The Pot of Broth (1904) tells a version of the story in which a clever Irish tramp uses his wits to swindle a shrewish medieval housewife out of her dinner.

The story is the basis of Marcia Brown's 1947 children's book Stone Soup: An Old Tale (1947), which features soldiers tricking miserly villagers into cooking them a feast. The book was a Caldecott Honor book in 1948 and was read aloud by the Captain (played by Bob Keeshan) on an early episode of Captain Kangaroo in the 1950s, as well as at least once in the 1960s or early 1970s.

In 1965, Gordon R. Dickson published a short story called "Soupstone", where a headstrong pilot is sent to solve a problem on a planet under the guise of a highly educated and competent official. He succeeds by pretending to understand everything, but actually merely making the locals apply their already present knowledge and abilities to the task.

"Stone Soup" (1968), written by Ann McGovern and illustrated by Nola Langner, tells the story of a little old lady and a hungry young man at the door asking for food, and how he tricks her into making stone soup.

In 1975, Walt Disney Productions published a Wonderful World of Reading book titled Button Soup. Daisy Duck tricks Scrooge McDuck to share his food to help flavor her Button Soup.

Canadian children's author Aubrey Davis adapted the story to a Jewish context in his book Bone Button Borscht (1996). According to Davis, he wrote the story when he was unable to find a story that he liked for a Hanukkah reading. Barbara Budd's narration of Bone Button Borscht traditionally airs across Canada on CBC Radio One's As It Happens, on the first day of Hanukkah.

French author and illustrator Anais Vaugelade published a children's picture book, Une soupe au caillou, in which the tramp from the original folktale is replaced by a wandering wolf, and the old woman by a curious hen. All characters in the story are animals, gathering to help making the stone soup, each of them carrying an ingredient for the final dish.

Jon J. Muth's children's book based on the story, also called Stone Soup (2003), is set in China, as is Ying Chang's The Real Story of Stone Soup (2007).

Robert Rankin's book Nostradamus Ate My Hamster features a version of the story introduced as an old Irish tale.

Music
Shel Silverstein's song "The Wonderful Soup Stone" tells a version of this story. Bobby Bare included the song on his album Lullabys, Legends and Lies (1973). and Dr. Hook & the Medicine Show included the song on their album Belly Up! (1973).

A version of the tale written by Tom Chapin and John Forster appears on Chapin's album Mother Earth (1990).

'Stone Soup' - an album released in November 2001 by the UK artist Moss (a.k.a. Bernard Moss) on Pork Recordings (catalogue ref. PORK 091).

Television
 Jim Henson's The Storyteller series contains one tale called "A Story Short", in which the Storyteller himself (played by John Hurt) is the main character. In the beginning, he arrives at a castle where a man is thrown out for begging for food. He proceeds to trick the King's cook into making stone soup. After the people are happily fed, the cook realizes what has happened and pleads with the King to let him boil the Storyteller in oil, but the King instead offers a way out — to tell him a story every day for a year instead.
 The PBS Kids show Between the Lions featured an episode with a version of the story being read. In this version, the strangers were replaced by aliens.
 The tale was adapted as an episode of the show Hungarian Folktales.
 A Soviet cartoon based on the Russian variant of the tale was made in 1982.
 Land of the Lost (1974 TV series) Season 1, Episode 14 is entitled "Stone Soup" in which Marshal (the father) uses Stone Soup to get his children to help gather things for dinner.
 Little House on the Prairie Season 8, Episode 13 is entitled "Stone Soup" and has this story as its theme.
 Robot Chicken Season 9, Episode 13 is entitled "Gimme That Chocolate Milk" and has a short sketch making fun of this parable. In it, the villagers kill the stranger who tricked them into sharing in order to cover up their "communal embarrassment".
 The Walking Dead Season 10, Episode 21. Carol mentions the "Stone Soup" story.

Lucky Iron Fish
A contemporary twist on "nail soup" helps relieve real-world iron-deficiency anemia in Cambodia. The Lucky Iron Fish is a cast iron bar in the shape of the "Try Kantrop" fish that many villagers consider lucky. When immersed into a simmering pot of soup, enough of the iron dissolves into the liquid to add the critical amounts of a trace nutrient needed to prevent certain types of anemia.

Military tactics
US Army General George S. Patton referred to the "rock soup method" of acquiring resources for attacks in the face of official disapproval by his superiors for offensive operations. In the military context, he sent units forward, ostensibly on reconnaissance missions, where he knew resistance was to be met. "Surprised" at the enemy resistance, Patton would later request support for his scouts, and these missions eventually turned into small scale probing attacks. Then, once full combat had begun, Patton would request (or make the executive decision) to encircle or push full force against enemy resistance, under the rationale that the reinforcements were either bogged down or unable to retreat. He notably did this during the Battle of Sicily, in the advance on Palermo, and again in the campaign in northwest Europe, notably near Metz when his 3rd US Army was officially halted during Operation Market Garden.

Places
A large pool located on Karl Johan street in Oslo, funded by the steel company Christiania Spigerverk ("Christiania Nail Factory"),  is nicknamed Spikersuppa ("Nail Soup") as a humorous reference to the story.

See also

 , the inverse of the Stone Soup story

References

Sources

External links

 

 
 
 
 "Stone Soup" from Google Books

Fables
Fictional food and drink
Collaboration
Folklore
Almeirim
ATU 1525-1639